The term Orthodoxy in Israel may refer to:

 Orthodox Judaism in Israel, representing adherents, communities and institutions of Orthodox Judaism, in Israel
 Eastern Orthodoxy in Israel, representing adherents, communities and institutions of various Eastern Orthodox Churches, in Israel
 Oriental Orthodoxy in Israel, representing adherents, communities and institutions of various Oriental Orthodox Churches, in Israel
 any other form of orthodoxy in Israel (political, ideological, social, economic, scientific, artistic)

See also
 Orthodoxy (disambiguation)
 Israel (disambiguation)
 Orthodox Church (disambiguation)